Taistoism was an orthodox pro-Soviet tendency in the mostly Eurocommunist Finnish communist movement in the 1970s and 1980s. The Taistoists were an interior opposition group in the Communist Party of Finland. They were named after their leader Taisto Sinisalo whose first name means "a battle", "a fight" or "a struggle". Sinisalo's supporters constituted a party within a party, but pressure from the Communist Party of the Soviet Union prevented the party from formally splitting. The term taistolaisuus was a derogatory nickname invented by Helsingin Sanomat and was never used by the group themselves. Although they were sometimes identified as "Stalinists", this was not a central part of their orthodoxy. Taisto Sinalo himself was quite critical of Stalin, though he did credit Stalin with the establishment of socialism in the USSR.

The opposition was expelled from the party 1985–1986 and it formed the Communist Party of Finland (Unity), which took the name "Communist Party of Finland" after the original party's bankruptcy in 1992.

Some of the former Taistoists later joined the Left Alliance or have since abandoned Communism altogether.

Notable former Taistoists

Members of Parliament
 Markus Kainulainen (1975–1979)
 Lauri Kantola (1962–1975)
 Mikko Kuoppa (1979–1987, 1995–2011)
 Ensio Laine (1968–1995)
 Pentti Liedes (1954–1966, 1970–1983, 1983–1985)
 Marja-Liisa Löyttyjärvi (1979–1991)
 Pauli Puhakka (1954–1983)
 Irma Rosnell (1954–1987)
 Taisto Sinisalo (1962–1979)
 Marjatta Stenius-Kaukonen (1975–1994, 1999–2003)
 Oili Suomi (1970–1972, 1977–1979)
 Sten Söderström (1979–1987)
 Esko-Juhani Tennilä (1975–2011)
 Seppo Toiviainen (1979–1987)
 Mirjam Tuominen (1970–1979)
 Pentti Tiusanen (1995–2011)
 Pirkko Turpeinen (1983–1987)
 Rainer Virtanen (1954–1972)

Cultural movement 
 Kaj Chydenius
 Kristiina Halkola
 Heikki Kinnunen
 Kaisa Korhonen
 Marja-Leena Mikkola
 Aulikki Oksanen
 Pirkko Saisio

Socialist student movement
 Yrjö Hakanen, chairman
 Satu Hassi, member

Journalists
 Urho Jokinen, Tiedonantaja newspaper main editor  1969–1984
 Jaakko Laakso, Tiedonantaja main editor toimittaja 1976–1991
 Leif Salmén
 Erkki Susi, Tiedonantaja editor 1971–1984, main editor a 1984–
 Esko-Juhani Tennilä
 Nils Torvalds, Arbetartidningen Enhet editor

Other
 Ilkka Kylävaara
 Johannes Pakaslahti
 Veikko Porkkala  
 Rauno Setälä
 Seppo Toiviainen
 Björn Wahlroos, CEO of Sampo Group

References

Further reading
 Hermannschlacht, Taistoismus und unpolitischer Finne by Andreas Dörner, Matti Hyvärinen and Kari Palonen 
 Taistolaisuuden musta kirja (The Black Book of Taistoism) by Ilkka Kylävaara 
 The Finnish Communist Party in the Finnish Political System 1963–1982 by Jukka Paastela

Communism in Finland
Political theories
Political history of Finland
Political party factions